Andrew  Brown (born August 28, 1984) is an American musician, multi-instrumentalist, and songwriter. He is a guitarist in the bands OneRepublic and Debate Team.

Biography and career 
Drew originated from Broomfield, Colorado. He moved to Los Angeles in 2004, where he formed OneRepublic with vocalist Ryan Tedder and guitarist Zach Filkins.

In January 2011, Brown formed the band Debate Team with OK Go drummer Dan Konopka, Hush Sound guitarist Bob Morris, and vocalist Ryan McNeill. They released an EP that year titled Wins Again.

OneRepublic 
Drew has been a guitar player for OneRepublic since 2005. Songs he has co-written for the band include "Say (All I Need)", "Stop and Stare", "All Fall Down," "Tyrant," and "Wont Stop" from their debut album Dreaming Out Loud; the title track from their second album Waking Up; and "Feel Again" and "Love Runs Out" from the band's third album Native.

Discography

 Dreaming Out Loud (2007)
 Waking Up (2009)
 Native (2013)
 Oh My My (2016)
 Human (2021)

References 

American male guitarists
1984 births
OneRepublic
Living people
21st-century American keyboardists
OneRepublic members